This list of blue plaques is an annotated list of people or events in the United Kingdom that have been commemorated by blue plaques. The plaques themselves are permanent signs installed in publicly visible locations on buildings to commemorate either a famous person who lived or worked in the building (or site) or an event that occurred within the building.

London/English Heritage plaques 

A list of blue plaques erected by English Heritage or its three predecessors in administering the blue plaque programme: the Society of Arts (1866–1901), the London County Council (1901–1965), and the Greater London Council (1965–1986) is linked above. The entries in the lists in are based on information from the English Heritage website. The erection of plaques was suspended from 1915 to 1919 and 1940 to 1947 due to the two world wars. It was announced in 2013 that the scheme would be indefinitely suspended until 2014 due to a 34% cut in English Heritage's budget, but it was able to continue thanks to private donations.

Other similar plaques 

Other plaques erected by local authorities, societies, companies, or private individuals that emulate the style and function of the plaques erected by English Heritage and its predecessors.

People

Places, organisations, or other

See also 
 List of blue plaques erected by the Royal Society of Chemistry
 List of hoax commemorative plaques

References

External links 
 

 
United Kingdom history-related lists
Lists of places in the United Kingdom